Hukam Chand Kachwai (born July 23, 1933 in Ujjain, Madhya Pradesh) was a leader of Bharatiya Janata Party, Social worker, trade unionist and a former member of Lok Sabha from Madhya Pradesh. Kachwai participated in Satyagraha and jailed for two months. To fullfill the demamnds of the workers of Shri Gopal Paper Mills, Kachwai went on 28 days hunger strike and again jailed for 57 days. Kachwai was jailed several times in the connections with politicals movements and remained detained for 19 months during Emergency in India.

Hukam  Chand Kachwai is the fist indian Member of Parliament who raised the questions in Indianparliament to develop the Atom Bomb in India to make the country powerful but he was opposed hard by MPs of Indian National Congress party.

Life 

Hukumchan was elected MP from Morena and Shajapur. Whereas, he was MP from Ujjain for two terms.  After the formation of Janata Party and BJP, he left the party and joined the Congress in the 1990s, due to a tussle over policy issues.

Former Indian President Ram Nath Kovind was a close aid to Hukam Chand Kachwai and after the death of Kachwai, Kovind was became emotional during his visit to Ujjain. In 1974, Kachwai fixed the marriage of Ram Nath Kovind, with Savita Kovind.

He was a Member of the Third, Fourth, Fifth and Sixth Lok Sabha representing Dewas,  Ujjain,  Morena and Ujjain Parliamentary constituencies.  He died in 1996. He belonged to the Koli community of Madhya Pradesh.

Other posts held 
 1964 - president of Bhartiya railway majdoor Sangh
 1969, president of Delhi Milk Scheme Employees Union
 1969, Bhartiya majdur parivahan Sangh
 1969, Group commander of Seva Dal Ujjain
 1969, Member of Rashtriya Swayamsevak Sangh
 1969, Patron of New Delhi Municipal Employees Union
 1969 - 1971, president of All India Ticket Checking Staff Association Western Railway
 1969 - 1971, Western Indian Railway Guards association
 1973 - 1975, Vice-President of Akhil Bhartiya Kshatriya Koli Samaj
 Member of Committee on the Welfare of Scheduled Castes and Scheduled Tribes

Social activities 
 1950 - 1952, Hukam Chand Kachwai Collected food and clothing in Ujjain to help the refugees from East Pakistan
 1952, Kachwai provided help to the victims of famine in Jhabua region of Madhya Pradesh and took part in Anti-Cow-Slaughter Movement
1957, active Member of the Seva Samiti 
 1957 - till death, worked actively for the eradication of evils of drinking, gambling and child marriage amongst the Koli community.

Tribute 
 In Ujjain, a trust is running in the respect of Hukamchand Munnalal Kachwai names as Hukam Chand Kachwai memorial trust.

References

|-

People from Ujjain
1996 deaths
India MPs 1977–1979
India MPs 1962–1967
India MPs 1967–1970
India MPs 1971–1977
Lok Sabha members from Madhya Pradesh
Bharatiya Jana Sangh politicians
1933 births
People from Morena district
People from Dewas
People from Dewas district
Politicians from Ujjain
Janata Party politicians
Bharatiya Janata Party politicians from Madhya Pradesh
Indians imprisoned during the Emergency (India)